Farler is an unincorporated community located in Perry County, Kentucky, United States.

The town was named for local storekeeper and postmaster William Farler. Its post office, opened in 1905, has closed.

References

Unincorporated communities in Perry County, Kentucky
Unincorporated communities in Kentucky